Zhang Ying (born 29 August 1998) is a Chinese field hockey player. She competed in the 2020 Summer Olympics.

References

External links
 

1998 births
Living people
Field hockey players at the 2020 Summer Olympics
Chinese female field hockey players
Olympic field hockey players of China